Miombo Hewani Wind Power Station, also Miombo Hewani Wind Farm (meaning "rocks in the air" in Swahili),  is a planned  wind-powered power station in the Njombe Region of Tanzania.

Location

Overview
To help diversify Tanzania's electricity sources, Windlab Developments Tanzania Limited (WDTL), have proposed to establish Miombo Hewani Wind Farm, a 300 megawatt project, to be developed in phases. The development company, WDTL, is a subsidiary of Australia’s Windlab Limited of Australia, with developments in Australia, the United States and South Africa.

In May 2018, the developers of this wind farm were granted an electricity generation license for a power plant of up to 300 megawatts. The license is the first-ever for a grid-ready wind farm in the history of Tanzania. The wind farm has a planned lifespan of 25 years from completion.

Development
It is expected that the first phase, consisting 34 turbines, will generate  and cost US$300 million. A new transmission line will transmit the power to a substation in Makambako, where the energy will be integrated into the national electric grid. The power station is expected to power one million average-sized Tanzanian homes.

Funding
This development has received partial funding from the Ministry for Foreign Affairs of Finland.

See also

 List of power stations in Tanzania

References

External links
Website of Windlab Limited

Wind farms in Tanzania
Iringa Region